Adrian Bamforth is a British comic book artist who has worked for 2000 AD as well as producing work for British small press comics like FutureQuake.

Bibliography
Comics work includes:

Judge Dredd:
 "Pret-a-porker" (in Zarjaz volume 1 #1, 2001) 
 "Married with juves" (with Gordon Rennie, in 2000 AD #1262, 2001) 
Judge Anderson: "Not All In The Mind" (with Alan Grant, in Zarjaz volume 1 #2, 2002) 
Sinister Dexter:
 "U R Here" (with Dan Abnett, in 2000 AD #1279, 2002) 
 "Narked for Death" (with Dan Abnett, in 2000 AD #1281, 2002) 
Past Imprefect: "The Red Menace" (with Gordon Rennie and inks: Lee Townsend, in 2000 AD #1318, 2002) 
 "Emigration" (with Arthur Wyatt, in FutureQuake #1, 2003) 
 "Down The Tubes" (with Arthur Wyatt, in FutureQuake #2, 2004) 
 "Outer Space" (with Arthur Wyatt, in FutureQuake #3, 2004) 
 "The Other side" (art and script, in Something Wicked #1, 2006)
Tharg's Future Shocks: "Optimal" (with Al Ewing, in 2000 AD #1496, 2006)
Tharg's Future Shorts: "Stasis" (art and script, in 2000 AD #1510, 2006)

Notes

References

2000 AD profile

External links

Living people
Year of birth missing (living people)
British comics artists